Manuel Alfonso Castro Dosal (born March 13, 1985), known professionally as Alfonso Dosal, is a Mexican actor.

Early life and career
Dosal was born in Mexico City on March 13, 1985.  

In his childhood he lived eight years in Querétaro and then returned to Mexico City. He studied acting at Casa Azul. Debuted in the telenovela Marina as young protagonist in 2006. After 4 years retiring in the telenovela Para Volver a Amar as young protagonist again and TVyNovelas Awards in 2011 awarded as Best Young Lead Actor of the Year.

In 2011 he played in theatrical performances El Knack, El viaje de Tina and Rojo. In 2012 played as special appearance in the teen telenovela Miss XV. In 2013 played in theatrical performance Agonía y Éxtasis de Steve Jobs. In 2014 played as special appearance again in the telenovela El color de la pasión.

Personal life
Dosal has been in a relationship with Solana Azulay from 2012. They have two children. In December 2010, Dosal came out as bisexual.

Filmography

Film

Television

Awards and nominations

TVyNovelas Awards

Premios People en Español

Premios Bravo

References

External links

 Official Site
 Facebook Official
 Twitter Official

1985 births
Living people
Mexican male television actors
Mexican male telenovela actors
Mexican male film actors
Mexican male stage actors
Male actors from Mexico City
Mexican LGBT actors
Bisexual male actors
21st-century LGBT people